David Ryder (1 May 1934 – 28 February 1985) was an Irish sailor. He competed in the Dragon event at the 1960 Summer Olympics.

References

External links
 

1934 births
1985 deaths
Irish male sailors (sport)
Olympic sailors of Ireland
Sailors at the 1960 Summer Olympics – Dragon
Sportspeople from Dublin (city)